Donji Murići is a village in the municipality of Bar, Montenegro. It is located in the Skadarska Krajina region, by Lake Skadar.

Geography 
Donji Murići (Muriq i Poshtëm/Lower Murići) is a division of the village Murići (Muriq). The village and its surrounding territory is divided into five neighbourhoods: Gornji Murići (Muriq i Sipërm/Upper Murići), Donji Murići, Rjeps, Pinç and the islet Beška (Bes).

Demographics
According to the 2011 census, its population was 101.

References

Populated places in Bar Municipality
Albanian communities in Montenegro